Telin Singapore was incorporated on 6 December 2007 as a wholly owned subsidiary of Telkom Indonesia International. As a member of TELKOM Group, Telin's strategic focus is to provide Infocom and connectivity services from Indonesia and beyond. Telin was awarded a Facilities-Based Operator (FBO) License in May 2008 from Infocomm Development Authority of Singapore (iDA). Telin's Goal is to increase the operating reach and services footprint for TELKOM Group.

In 2018, Telin Singapore partnered with Campana Group to develop internet connectivity between Myanmar and Singapore.

References

External links
 Telin Singapore official website

2007 establishments in Singapore
Telkom Indonesia
Companies of Singapore